The Corn Exchange (also the Exchange Cinema and the Granada Exchange) is a Grade II* listed building in Chichester, West Sussex, England. Built in 1833, the building has also been used as a Granada cinema. It is currently leased to a number of companies, including Next and the Boston Tea Party café chain.

History
The Corn Exchange was built between 1832 and 1833 by local architect George Draper, on the corner of East Street and Baffin's Lane in Chichester.  In 1835 the roof was found to be unsafe and the building was stated to be in danger of collapse; architect John Elliott rebuilt and remodelled it the following year.

The Corn Exchange was financed by 70 local corn merchants, who each contributed between £25 and £250. Corn, wheat, oats and barley were commonly traded at the Corn Exchange, and in 1899 wool fleeces were also recorded as being sold at auction at the Corn Exchange. The Corn Exchange was set up to increase trade of goods, as local merchants were unwilling to sell small quantities of goods. They preferred to sell at least a bushel at a time. The Corn Exchange also allowed merchants to sample goods before purchasing them.

From the 1880s, parts of the Corn Exchange were rented out as a cinema. It was one of Chichester's first cinemas, and the Corn Exchange has a blue plaque commemorating this. In 1922, the Corn Exchange became a full-time cinema, and the following year, the cinema was purchased by London and District Cinemas. In 1927, the cinema was renovated, and was renamed the Exchange Cinema. The Kid Brother was the first film shown at the renovated cinema.

In 1948, Granada cinemas took over the Corn Exchange, and named it the Granada Exchange. The Granada cinema closed in 1980. Star Wars film The Empire Strikes Back was the last film shown at the Granada cinema. The Corn Exchange was then left unused for six years, before being leased to McDonald's, who used it until at least the late 1990s.

Part of the Corn Exchange is currently leased to Next. In 2018, Next said that they were looking to close their Chichester Corn Exchange store. Other companies that have been based in the Corn Exchange include the Boston Tea Party café chain, a Grape Tree health food store, and two Indian restaurants.

To the rear stood a three-storey corn store built of red and grey brick. This was modified and converted into offices in 1967. Another corn store designed in 1871 by architect John Elkington, this time of stone with brick dressings, was similarly converted in the early 1980s.

Architecture
The building is Greek Revivalist in style. Across the front of the building are six Doric columns, each of which weigh 3 tonnes and are made of cast iron. They form a "noble hexastyle portico" which projects on to the pavement and rests on six substantial stone bases. There are four smaller columns behind it. These support a large pediment and decorative entablature which runs around the side elevations of the building.

References

Greek Revival architecture in the United Kingdom
Greek Revival buildings
Buildings and structures in Chichester
Buildings and structures completed in 1833
Grade II* listed buildings in West Sussex
Listed markets and exchanges in the United Kingdom
Grade II* listed cinemas
Granada Theatres